Roosevelt Beach may refer to:

 Roosevelt Beach, New York, US
 Naples Beach, also known as Roosevelt Beach, at Half Moon Bay State Beach, California, US
 Roosevelt Beach, Oregon, US 
 Roosevelt Beach, Washington, US